John Foster may refer to:

15th/16th/17th-century politicians 
 John Foster (MP for Bristol), 15th-century MP for Bristol
 John Foster (died 1576), Member of Parliament for Winchester, Plympton Erle and Hindon
 John Foster (by 1508-47/51), MP for Much Wenlock
 John Foster (died 1558), MP for Shaftesbury and Hertfordshire
 John Foster (printer) (1648–1681) was the earliest American engraver and the first Boston printer.

18th-century politicians
John Foster of Dunleer (died 1747), MP for Dunleer, grandfather of 1st Baron Oriel
John Thomas Foster (1747–1796), MP
John William Foster (1745–1809), MP for Dunleer
John Foster, 1st Baron Oriel (1740–1828), speaker of the Irish House of Commons
John Foster (Dunleer MP) (1770–1792), MP for Dunleer 1790–1792, son of 1st Baron Oriel

19th/20th-century politicians
John Leslie Foster (1781–1842), Irish barrister, judge and member of parliament
John Foster (Australian politician) (1818–1900), politician in colonial New South Wales and Victoria
John W. Foster (1836–1917), American diplomat
John H. Foster (1862–1917), U.S. Representative from Indiana
Kenneth Foster (politician) (John Kenneth Foster, 1866–1930), British Conservative Party politician
John Foster (MP for Northwich) (1904–1982), British Conservative Party politician
John Foster (Tasmanian politician) (1792–1875), member of the Tasmanian Legislative Council
John Foster (Lord Mayor of York) on List of Lord Mayors of York
John Foster, candidate in the 1927 Manitoba general election
John Foster (Virginia politician) on List of mayors of Richmond, Virginia

Academics 
John Stuart Foster (1890–1944), Canadian physicist
John S. Foster Jr. (John Stuart Foster Jr., born 1922), American physicist and government official
John Bellamy Foster (born 1953), American Marxist scholar
John Wells Foster (1815–1873), American geologist
John Foster (essayist) (1770–1843), English essayist
John Foster (philosopher) (1941–2009), British philosopher
John Foster (canon) (died 1773), headmaster of Eton College
John Foster (paleontologist) (born 1966), American paleontologist
John Wilson Foster (born 1942), Irish literary critic and cultural historian

Art and entertainment 
John Foster (British singer) (born 1960), British singer
John Foster (Italian singer) (born 1939), Italian singer
John Foster (cartoonist) (1886–1959), also director
John Foster (printer) (1648–1681), American printer and engraver
John B. Foster (artist) (1865–1930), New England watercolorist
John Foster, a character in the television series Skins
John Foster (cinematographer), see Independent Spirit Award for Best Cinematography
John Foster (composer) (1752–1822), English composer

Sports 
John Foster Jr. (sailor) (born 1963), American sport-sailor
John Foster Sr. (sailor) (born 1938), American sport-sailor & sled racer
John Foster (footballer) (born 1973), English footballer
John Foster (baseball) (born 1978), American baseball player
John Foster (cricketer) (born 1955), former English cricketer
John B. Foster (baseball) (1863–1941), New York City baseball writer, sports editor, and ballclub officer
John Foster (sport shooter) (born 1936), American sports shooter
John Foster (water polo) (1931–2013), Australian water polo player

Journalists
John Foster (Canadian journalist), see This Land
John Foster (BBC journalist) on Scottish Lobby

Religious figures
John Foster (priest) (1921–2000), Anglican dean of Guernsey
John Foster, 18th century American clergyman, husband of Hannah Webster Foster
John Onesimus Foster (1833–1920), American Methodist minister
John Foster (Archdeacon of Huntingdon), Archdeacon of Huntingdon and Wisbech

Others 
John G. Foster (1823–1874), United States Army officer and Union general during the American Civil War
John Foster, sound editor, see BAFTA Award for Best Sound
John Foster (trade unionist), see Jeremy Dear
John Foster (textile manufacturer) (1798–1879), British worsted cloth manufacturer
John Foster Sr. (engineer) (1758–1827), Liverpool based British engineer
John Foster (architect, born 1786) (1786–1846), Liverpool based British architect, son of John Foster Sr.
John Foster (architect, born 1830) (1830–1880), Bristol based British architect
John H. Foster (physician) (1796–1874), American physician and member of boards of education
John Foster (died 1829), plantation owner, owned the slave Abdul Rahman Ibrahima Sori
John Foster (fireboat), see MetalCraft Marine

See also
Jon Foster (disambiguation)
Jack Foster (disambiguation)
John Forster (disambiguation)
Jonathan Foster (disambiguation)